Krayenberggemeinde is a municipality in the Wartburgkreis district of Thuringia, Germany. It was named after the hill Krayenberg. It was formed on 31 December 2013 by the merger of the former municipalities Dorndorf and Merkers-Kieselbach.

References

Wartburgkreis